The Cape Copper Company 0-6-2 Scotia Class of 1900 was a South African steam locomotive from the pre-Union era in the Cape of Good Hope.

Between 1900 and 1905, six more Mountain type tender locomotives with a  wheel arrangement were placed in service by the Cape Copper Company on its two-foot six inch gauge Namaqualand Railway between Port Nolloth and O'okiep in the Cape of Good Hope. Later described as the Scotia Class, they were similar to the earlier Clara Class locomotives, but with shorter boilers, longer fireboxes and larger firegrates.

Namaqualand Railway
The Namaqualand Railway was constructed between 1869 and 1876 by the Cape Copper Mining Company, restructured as the Cape Copper Company in 1888. The railway from Port Nolloth on the West Coast to the copper mines around O'okiep was initially exclusively mule-powered, but in 1871 two  locomotives named John King and Miner were acquired by the mining company on an experimental basis. They were followed between 1886 and 1888 by three  condensing locomotives, and from 1890 by four  Clara Class Mountain type tender locomotives.

The Mountain locomotives
Between 1900 and 1905, six more  tender locomotives of the Mountain type were delivered to the Cape Copper Company from Kitson and Company. Since the first three locomotives of the Clara Class suffered major problems with their fireboxes and tubes as a result of the poor quality of water in the region and tough working conditions, a fourth locomotive, no. 7 named Albion, had been delivered in 1898 with a shorter boiler to make room for a longer firebox in an effort to overcome these issues. These six new locomotives were a further development in the same direction, also with larger fireboxes, but with slightly longer boilers than no. 7 Albion, which resulted in boiler-and-firebox assemblies which were about a foot longer than those of the earlier locomotives.

Characteristics
These six locomotives were very similar in appearance to the earlier Clara Class, but could be visually identified by their steam domes which were located further forward, closer to their chimneys, as well as by the different shape of the cutaway at the rear of their frames above their trailing axles. They were named Scotia, Hibernia, Cambria, Canada, Australia and India respectively and were also numbered, in the range from 8 to 10, 12, 14 and 15. They were later described as the Scotia Class.

Like their predecessors, the condensing and Clara Class locomotives, they were equipped with sheet-metal casing above and below their running boards. This was to protect the motion and bearings, as well as working parts of the J. Hawthorn-Kitson valve gear which protruded above the running boards, from wind-blown sand. The bottom encasement was hinged to allow easy access to the motion. The picture alongside shows a Scotia Class locomotive without this casing.

Like the earlier locomotives, the Scotia Class was also delivered with copper boilers and fireboxes. Around April 1903, no. 8 Scotia was fitted with an experimental steel boiler and around 1907-1908 two more steel boilers with copper fireboxes were acquired as spare boilers for the Scotia Class.

Service
A fall in copper prices at the end of the First World War resulted in the closure of the Cape Copper Company mines and in June 1922 the Company was put into the hands of receivers and managers. In 1926, the South African assets of the Company were optioned to the American Metal Company who, together with the Newmont Mining Corporation, formed the South African Copper Company in 1928 to hold the option, which was taken up in 1931. When the economic situation improved, the option holders and other interested parties formed the O'okiep Copper Company, which took over the assets and liabilities of the South African Copper Company and resumed mining in May 1937.

Little mining had been done during the depression years but, as a common carrier, the Namaqualand Railway was not closed and a skeleton service of two trains per week continued to operate. During the approximately nineteen years while the mines were closed, the railway was apparently run more or less by one man, Jack Meadows, the station master at O'okiep. He would also travel on the twice-weekly trains to Port Nolloth, acting as conductor and bookkeeper. At Port Nolloth, he would carry out the duties of port captain and supervise offloading and loading before returning to O'okiep the following day. As a result, the line was kept in good repair during the lean years.

The Cape Copper Company steam locomotives also passed into the hands of the O'okiep Copper Company. Whether all were still serviceable is doubtful, but seventeen engines were still shown as in stock in the Railway Year Books, until the 1938/1939 edition. The 1939/1940 edition, however, listed only three steam locomotives, the identity of which is not known.

Specifications
The numbers, names, works numbers, years built, date of arrival, date in service, number of boiler tubes, heating surface of the boiler tubes and firebox and the total heating surface of the Scotia Class are listed in the table.

Illustration

References

0650
0-6-2 locomotives
C1 locomotives
Kitson locomotives
Railway locomotives introduced in 1900
1900 in South Africa
2 ft 6 in gauge locomotives
Scrapped locomotives